The 2003 Copa AT&T was a men's tennis tournament played on outdoor clay courts at the Buenos Aires Lawn Tennis Club in Buenos Aires, Argentina and was part of the International Series of the 2003 ATP Tour. It was the 31st edition of the tournament and was held from 17 February through 23 February 2003. First-seeded Carlos Moyá won the singles title.

Finals

Singles

 Carlos Moyá defeated  Guillermo Coria 6–3, 4–6, 6–4
 It was Moyà's 1st title of the year and the 12th of his career.

Doubles

 Mariano Hood/  Sebastián Prieto defeated  Lucas Arnold /  David Nalbandian 6–2, 6–2
It was Hood's 2nd title of the year and the 6th of his career. It was Prieto's only title of the year and the 4th of his career.

References

External links
 Official website 
 ATP tournament profile

Copa AtandAmpt, 2003
ATP Buenos Aires
Copa ATandT
February 2003 sports events in South America